Yuyun Ismawati (born 1964) is an Indonesian environmental engineer. She has worked on design of city and rural water supply systems, and later on designing systems for safe waste management. She was awarded the Goldman Environmental Prize in 2009.

She is Senior Advisor and co-founder of BALIFOKUS Foundation, a Bali-based environmental NGO. Yuyun has broad and rich experiences in urban environmental management issues, environmental health and sanitation, as well as climate and toxics issues.

References

External links

1964 births
Living people
Indonesian environmentalists
Indonesian women environmentalists
Goldman Environmental Prize awardees